The season of 1897–98 in Scottish football was the 25th season of competitive football in Scotland and the eighth season of the Scottish Football League.

League competitions

Scottish Division One 

Celtic are champions of the Scottish Division One.

Scottish Division Two 

Kilmarnock won the Scottish Division Two but were not promoted.

Other honours

Cup honours

National

County

Non-league honours

Senior 
Highland League

Other Leagues

Scotland national team

Key:
(A) = Away match
(H) = Home match
BHC = British Home Championship

Other national teams

Scottish League XI

See also
1897–98 Rangers F.C. season

Notes

References

External links
Scottish Football Historical Archive

 
Seasons in Scottish football